The men's competition in the super-heavyweight ( +105 kg) division was held on 12–13 November 2011.

Schedule

Medalists

Records

Results

New records

References

(Pages 55, 58, 60 & 62) Start List 
2011 IWF World Championships Results Book Pages 50–52 
Results

2011 World Weightlifting Championships